The Political Work Department of the Central Military Commission is the chief political organ under the Central Military Commission. It was created in January 2016 following the 2015 People's Republic of China military reform. Its predecessor was the People's Liberation Army General Political Department.

The department leads all political and cultural activities in the People's Liberation Army. Its current director is Admiral Miao Hua; its deputy directors are Hou Hehua and Yu Guang.

The Political Work Department's Liaison Department controls a United Front organization called the China Association for International Friendly Contact (CAIFC) that is active in overseas intelligence gathering and influence operations.

History 
In November 2015 the General Political Department of the Central Military Commission was abolished and was replaced with the Political Work Department as part of Chairman Xi Jinping's military reforms. Its role is to integrate the CCP and its ideology and propaganda into the People's Liberation Army. In January 2016, the Political Work Department became official.

Attached agencies and units 
 Central Military Band of the People's Liberation Army of China
 Central Military Commission Political Work Department Song and Dance Troupe
 People's Liberation Army Daily
 August First Film Studio
 Military Museum of the Chinese People's Revolution

See also 

 Chinese information operations and information warfare
 Central Leading Group for Military Reform

References 

 
2016 establishments in China
Chinese propaganda organisations
Chinese intelligence agencies
Information operations units and formations
Central Military Commission (China)
People's Liberation Army